This is a timeline documenting events of jazz in the year 1994.

Events

March
 25 – The 21st Vossajazz started in Voss, Norway (March 25 – 27).

May
 20 – The 23rd Moers Festival started in Moers, Germany (June 20 – 23).
 26 – The 22nd Nattjazz started in Bergen, Norway (May 26 – June 5).

July
 1
 The 17th Copenhagen Jazz Festival started in Copenhagen, Denmark (July 1–10).
 The 4th Jazz Fest Wien started in Wien, Austria (July 1–15).
 The 15th Montreal International Jazz Festival started in Montreal, Quebec, Canada (July 1–16).
 The 28th Montreux Jazz Festival started in Montreux, Switzerland (July 1–16).
 8 – The 19th North Sea Jazz Festival started in The Hague (July 8–10).
 16 – The 29th Pori Jazz started in Pori, Finland (July 16–24).
 18 – The 35th Moldejazz started in Molde, Norway (July 18–23).

August
 12 – The 11th Brecon Jazz Festival started in Brecon, Wales (August 12–14).

September
 16 – The 37th Monterey Jazz Festival started in Monterey, California (September 16–18).

Album releases

Myra Melford: Even the Sounds Shine
Toshiko Akiyoshi: Desert Lady
Matthew Shipp: Critical Mass
Pat Metheny: Zero Tolerance for Silence
Henry Threadgill: Carry the Day
Ken Vandermark: Solid Action
Steve Coleman: Def Trance Beat
Chick Corea: Expressions
Misha Mengelberg: Mix
Bobby Previte: Slay the Suitors
Joshua Redman: MoodSwing
Franklin Kiermyer: Solomon's Daughter
Mark Helias: Loopin' the Cool
Jessica Williams: Momentum
Fred Anderson: Vintage Duets
David S. Ware: Earthquation
Eliane Elias: Solos and Duets
Hugh Masekela: Hope
Ray Anderson, Han Bennink and Christy Doran: Azurety
John Surman Quartet: Stranger Than Fiction
Wallace Roney: Mistérios
Peter Erskine: Time Being
Louis Sclavis and Dominique Pifarély: Acoustic Quartet
Edward Vesala with Sound & Fury: Nordic Gallery
Red Sun and SamulNori: Then Comes The White Tiger
Krakatau: Matinale
John Abercrombie Trio: Speak of the Devil
Trevor Watts and the Moire Music Ensemble: A Wider Embrace
Jan Garbarek with Anouar Brahem and Ustad Shaukat Hussain: Madar
Don Cherry with Bobo Stenson and Lennart Åberg: Dona Nostra
Vincent Herring: The Days of Wine and Roses
Michel Camilo: One More Once
Marilyn Crispell: Stellar Pulsations / Three Composers
Karl Berger: Conversations
Charlie Haden's Quartet West: Always Say Goodbye
European Music Orchestra: Guest

Deaths

 January
 1 – James Clay, American tenor saxophonist and flutist (born 1935).
 30 – Tiny Davis, American trumpeter and vocalist (born 1909).

 February
 8 – Raymond Scott, American composer, band leader, pianist, and electronic instrument inventor (born 1908).

 March
 9 – Maurice Purtill or Moe Purtill, American drummer, Glenn Miller Orchestra (born 1916).
 13 – Danny Barker, American guitarist, banjoist, vocalist, and author (born 1909).
 19 – Rafig Babayev, Azerbaijani musician and composer (born 1937).
 24 – Tommy Benford, American drummer (born 1905).

April
 2 – Rowland Greenberg, Norwegian trumpeter (born 1920).
 6 – Dick Cary, American trumpeter, composer, and arranger (born 1916).
 16 – Ralph Ellison, American novelist and literary critic (born 1913).
 22 – Jack Bentley, English trombonist, journalist, and scriptwriter (born 1913).

 May
 23 – Joe Pass, American guitarist of Sicilian descent (born 1929).
 25 – Eric Gale, American guitarist (born 1938).
 26
 Gil Fuller, American composer and arranger (born 1920).
 Sonny Sharrock, American guitarist (born 1940).
 27 – Red Rodney, American trumpeter (born 1927).
 29 – Oliver Jackson, American drummer (born 1933).
 30 – Jean Omer, Belgian reedist and bandleader (born 1912).

June
 7 – Willie Humphrey, American clarinetist (born 1900).
 14
 Henry Mancini, American composer, conductor, and arranger (born 1924).
 Lionel Grigson, British pianist, cornettist, trumpeter, and composer (born 1942).
 21 – Dennis Berry, English saxophonist, composer, arranger, and producer (born 1921).

 July
 11 – Lex Humphries, American drummer (born 1936).

 August
 6 – Jacques Pelzer, Belgian alto saxophonist and flautist (born 1924).
 12 – Gene Cherico, American upright bassist (born 1935).
 18 – Charles Redland, Swedish saxophonist, bandleader, and composer (born 1911).

 September
 5 – Billy Usselton, American jazz reed player (born 1926).
 6 – Max Kaminsky, American trumpeter and bandleader (born 1908).
 13 – John Stevens, English drummer, Spontaneous Music Ensemble (born 1940).
 16 – Bernie Leighton, American pianist (born 1921).
 20 – Jimmy Hamilton, American clarinetist, tenor saxophonist, and composer (born 1917).
 22
 Bob Lively, American saxophonist (born 1923).
 Leonard Feather, British pianist, composer, and producer (born 1914).
 29 – David van Kriedt, American composer, saxophonist, and music teacher (born 1922).

 October
 3 – Scoville Browne, American reedist (born 1909).
 4 – Danny Gatton, American guitarist (born 1945).
 5 – Nini Rosso, Italian jazz trumpeter and composer (born 1926).
 8 – John Neely, American tenor saxophonist and arranger (born 1930).
 21
 Lanny Steele, American pianist and composer (born 1933).
 Thore Ehrling, Swedish trumpeter, composer, and bandleader (born 1912).

 November
 4 – Jack Sharpe, English saxophonist and bandleader (born 1930).
 7 – Shorty Rogers, American trumpeter and flugelhornist (born 1924).
 10 – Carmen McRae, American singer, composer, pianist, and actress (born 1922).
 18 – Cab Calloway, American singer and bandleader (born 1907).
 28 – Al Levitt, American drummer (born 1932).
 30 – Connie Kay, American drummer (born 1927).

 December
 8 – Antonio Carlos Jobim, Brazilian composer, pianist, songwriter, arranger, and singer (born 1927).
 14 – Mary Ann McCall, American singer (born 1919).
 19
 Bill Douglass, American drummer (born 1923).
 Noel Pointer, American jazz violinist and record producer (born 1954).

Births

 February
 8 – Nikki Yanofsky, Canadian singer.

 March
 23 – Gentle Bones, Singaporean singer and composer.

 April
 9 – Jo David Meyer Lysne, Norwegian guitarist and composer.

 May
 3 – Signe Førre, Norwegian singer, upright bassist, and composer.

 Unknown date
 Amalie Holt Kleive, Norwegian singer and composer.
 Billie Black, British singer.
 Veronica Swift, American singer.

See also

 1990s in jazz
 List of years in jazz
 1994 in music

References

External links 
 History Of Jazz Timeline: 1994 at All About Jazz

Jazz
Jazz by year